Oury Jalloh (1969 in Conakry, Guinea – 7 January 2005, in Dessau, Germany) was an asylum seeker who died in a fire in a police cell in Dessau, Germany. The hands and feet of Jalloh, who was alone in the cell, were tied to a mattress. A fire alarm went off, but was initially turned off without further action by an officer. The case caused national and international outrage at the official narrative of suicide.

Life 
According to documents that his parents later filed in court, Oury Jalloh was born in 1969 in Conakry, Guinea.  Reportedly he fled from the Sierra Leone Civil War to Guinea, where his parents were already living, and came to Germany in 1999, where he applied for political asylum. His application was declined, but he received an exceptional leave to remain in the country. His child with a German citizen was put up for adoption by the mother shortly after birth.

Death 
The official narrative, as presented by police officers in their subsequent trial, was reported by newspapers such as Der Tagesspiegel. In the morning of January 7, 2005, at about 8 am, some street cleaners called the police and reported that a female colleague felt threatened by a drunk man (who was Oury Jalloh). When two policemen (Hans-Ulrich M. and Udo S.) arrived, Jalloh declined to show his identification and then resisted arrest. The officers put him in a headlock and took him into custody, intending to book him for harassment although charges were never made. At the police station, the two policemen took Jalloh to the basement and held him whilst a doctor took his blood to test for alcohol and drugs. The test showed a BAC of about 0.3% and indicated usage of cocaine. The doctor assessed Jalloh as safe to be locked up. Jalloh was taken to a cell and held until he could be seen by a judge. Two officers dragged him to a cell and handcuffed him to a bed by his hands and feet.

Policewoman Beate H. was working in the second floor control room, together with Andreas S., her superior. On the intercom she heard Jalloh rattling his chains and swearing, so she attempted to calm him and she reports later she heard other officers in the cell. She went to check on him herself at about 11:30 am, noting nothing special. She returned to the control room, where Andreas S. turned down the intercom volume and she told him to turn it back up. At around noon she claimed she heard splashing sounds and told Andreas S. it was his turn to check. She originally said that after the fire alarm went off,  Andreas S. turned it off twice. When another different alarm went off, he went to check what was going on. Gerhard M. followed Andreas S. downstairs to the cells, where they found Jalloh alive but burning to death. His final word was "Fire".

The police suggested that Jalloh had burnt himself to death, using a lighter to ignite the foam mattress he was lying on in the cell. There was no lighter in the cell. One appeared in an evidence bag several days after Jalloh's death.

Federal investigations 

The official autopsy concluded that the immediate cause of death was likely heat shock to Jalloh's lungs by smoke inhalation. A later 2019 autopsy conducted by experts from Goethe University after being commissioned by Jalloh's family, found that he had a broken rib, a broken nose and a fracture at the base of his skull, indicating that Oury Jalloh may have been tortured before his death. The original autopsy had only listed a recent nose fracture. The doctors were convinced that the injuries had occurred before death.

In March 2007, a trial was opened at the state court of Dessau against police officers Hans-Ulrich M. and his superior, Andreas S. The two officers were charged for causing bodily harm with fatal consequences, and for involuntary manslaughter, respectively. On 8 December 2008 the court acquitted both defendants of all charges. According to Manfred Steinhoff, the presiding judge, contradictory testimony had prevented clarification of the circumstances and had obstructed due process. In his closing speech Steinhoff accused the police officers of lying in court and thus damaging the reputation of the state of Saxony-Anhalt. The trial had thrown up inconsistencies and gaps in the narrative of the police officers and had lasted 60 days instead of the scheduled four. Fire experts had been unable to recreate the means of death. The issue of how the lighter that had allegedly been used to start the fire got into the cell was unexplained. Beate H. changed her initial report to say that Andreas S. had not turned down the fire alarm twice but rather got up and went downstairs, but she was unable to say exactly when because she worked with her back facing the door. The family and supporters of Jalloh were outraged by the verdict. The family had been offered 5,000 euros by the court since it could not establish the guilt of the officers, but Jalloh's father said he did not want the money.

On January 7, 2010, exactly five years after Jalloh died in his cell, the Bundesgerichtshof federal court in Karlsruhe overturned the earlier verdict. The case was relegated to the state court of Saxony-Anhalt at Magdeburg for retrial. During the investigations the deaths of Hans-Jürgen Rose (died from internal injuries hours after being released from the same police building in 1997) and Mario Bichtemann (died from an unsupervised skull fracture in the same cell in 2002) were re-examined. In 2012, Andreas S. was found guilty of involuntary manslaughter and fined €10,800. A new trial then began in 2014 and ended without any convictions in 2017.

However, they concluded that the district attorney's final dismissal of the case in 2017 was "factually and legally correct in view of available evidence".

Initiative in Memory of Oury Jalloh 
The Initiative in Memory of Oury Jalloh (Initiative in Gedenken an Oury Jalloh) was set up to pursue justice for Oury Jalloh and to campaign against police violence. In 2021, the initiative commissioned a report from a fire forensics expert to assess how Jalloh died. The expert found it unlikely that someone tied to a bed could have set themselves on fire. A dummy body made from a dead pig was then attached to the mattress and set on fire. It was only when using petrol that the dummy body burnt in a way commensurate to the way the body of Jalloh was burned. The expert concluded that it was most likely petrol had been used.

Based on this opinion, the initiative and the family of Jalloh called for the murder investigation to be reopened by the Federal Prosecutor. They also announced plans to sue the Attorney General's Office of Saxony-Anhalt for obstruction of justice, because it had ceased its investigation in 2018.

In popular culture 
A television documentary entitled Tod in der Zelle – Warum starb Oury Jalloh? was released in 2006. It went on to win the "Best professional production" award at the 2006 .

See also
 Death of Christy Schwundeck
 Killing of N'deye Mareame Sarr

References

Sources

Further reading

English

 List of articles published by Deutsche Welle about the case since 2006
 
 Video detailing late 2013 evidence which caused the reopening of the case.

German

 
 In-depth reporting on every day single day in court during the first trial (2007–2008)

Verdicts
 First verdict by the state court of Dessau-Roßlau (2008)
 Dessau-Roßlau state court's press release about the first verdict:
 2010 verdict by the Federal Court of Justice, overturning the 2008 verdict and ordering a retrial

1968 births
2005 deaths
2005 in Germany
Crime in Saxony-Anhalt
Deaths by person in Germany
Deaths from fire
Deaths in police custody in Germany
Dessau
Drug traffickers
People from Koinadugu District
Prisoners who died in German detention
Racism in Germany
Sierra Leonean emigrants to Germany
Sierra Leonean people imprisoned abroad
Sierra Leonean people who died in prison custody
Trials in Germany
Sierra Leonean refugees